Raymond E. Dorr (November 2, 1941 – March 1, 2001) was an American football player and coach.  He was the 15th head football coach for the Southern Illinois Salukis in Carbondale, Illinois and he held that position for four seasons, from 1984 until 1987.  His overall coaching record at SIU was 17 wins, 27 losses, and 0 ties.  This ranks him eighth at SIU in terms of total wins and 11th at SIU in terms of winning percentage.

Dorr died on March 1, 2001, at his home in College Station, Texas after suffering from amyotrophic lateral sclerosis.

Head coaching record

References

1941 births
2001 deaths
American football quarterbacks
Akron Zips football coaches
Kent State Golden Flashes football coaches
Kentucky Wildcats football coaches
Southern Illinois Salukis football coaches
Texas A&M Aggies football coaches
USC Trojans football coaches
Washington Huskies football coaches
West Virginia Wesleyan Bobcats football players
People from Salem, Ohio
Neurological disease deaths in Texas
Deaths from motor neuron disease